This is a list of educational establishments in the Union Territory of Puducherry in India.

Universities
 Pondicherry University
 Puducherry Technological University

Colleges
 Aarupadai Veedu Medical College & Hospital
Achariya College of Engineering & Technology
Alpha College of Engineering and Technology
 Bharathidasan Government College for Women
 Bharathiyar College of Engineering and Technology, Karaikal
 Bharathiar Palkalaikoodam, Ariyankuppam, Puducherry.
 Christ College of Engineering and Technology, Pitchaveeranpet, Puducherry
 Christ Institute of Technology (CIT), Ramanathapuram, Puducherry
 Ganesh College of Engineering and Technology
 Indira Gandhi Institute of Dental Sciences
 Indira Gandhi Medical College and Research Institute
 Jawaharlal Institute of Postgraduate Medical Education & Research
 Kasthurba College for Women, Villianur
 Mahatma Gandhi Government Arts College, Mahé
 Mahatma Gandhi Medical College and Research Institute
 Mahatma Gandhi Postgraduate Institute of Dental Sciences
 Mahé Co-operative College for Higher Studies and Education
 Manakula Vinayagar Institute of Technology
 National Institute of Technology, Puducherry
 Orient Flight School
 Perunthalaivar Kamarajar Institute of Engineering and Technology
 Pondicherry Engineering College
 Pondicherry Institute of Medical Sciences
 Raak College of Engineering and Technology
 Rajiv Gandhi College of Engineering and Technology
 Rajiv Gandhi College of Veterinary and Animal Sciences
 Regency Institute of Technology
 RVS engineering College
 Saradha Gangadharan College
 Shree Sathguru Engg. College
 Shri Krishnaa College of Engineering & Technology
 Sri Aurobindo International Centre of Education
 Sri Ganesh College of Engineering & Technology
 Sri Lakshmi Narayana Institute of Medical Sciences
 Sri Manakula Vinayagar Engineering College
 Sri Manakula Vinayagar Medical College & Hospital
 Sri Venkateshwaraa College of Engineering and Technology
 Sri Venkateshwaraa Medical College Hospital and Research Centre
 Tagore Arts College
 University College of Engineering
 Vinayaka Missions Medical College

High schools

The following high schools are situated in the Union Territory of Puducherry:

 Aadavaa Vidyaa Mandir
 Amala Higher Secondary School
 Appu English High School
 Balar Vidyalaya High School
 Bhagvan Sri Ramakrishna English High School
 Bharatha Devi English High School
 Bharath English High School
 Bharathi English Middle School
 Bharathidhasan English High School
 Deepa Oli High School (A)
 Ever Green English High School
 Gandhi English High School
 Holy Angels High School
 Ideal Matric School, Villianur
 Immaculate Heart of Mary's Girl's High School (A)
 Immaculate Heart of Mary's High School (A)
 Jawahar High School
 Jayarani English Middle School
 Jayarani High School (A)
 K.K.Sherwood Matri High School
 Kalaimagal English School
 Kavi Bharthi High School
 Little Flower High School
 Little Star English High School
 Institut Français de Pondichéry
 Lycée français de Pondichéry (French international school)
 Malar English School
 Mother Theresa High School
 Mother Theresa, Thillai Maistry St.
 Muthurathina Arangam Matric School
 National English High School
 New Land English High School
 Our Lady of Lourdes Boys High School (A)
 Our Lady of Victory English High School
 Pavendar High School
 Perunthalaivar Kamaraj High School
Petit Seminaire Higher Secondary School
 Presidency High School
 Prime Rose School, (ICSE School)
 Queen Mary's English School
 Rakk International School
 S.S.B.A. English School
 Sabari Vidhyasharam High School
 Sacred Heart of Jesus High School (A)
 Santha Clara Convent School
 Santhamani English High School
 Saradha Vidhyala English School
 Sigma English High School
 Societe Progressiste High School (A)
 Sree Hari International School
 Sree Saibaba High School
 Sri Navadurga English High School
 Sri Rabindranath Tagore English High School
 Sri Ramachandra Vidyalaya High School
 Sri Ramachandra Vidyalaya Matri School
 Sri Ramakrishna Paramahamsa English High School
 Sri Saimatha English High School
 Sri Sampoorna Vidyalaya High School
 Sri Saraswathi English School
 Sri Saraswathy Vidyalaya, High School
 Sri Shakthi High School, PonNagar
 Sri Sithanandha High School
 St. Ann's High School (A)
 St. Antony's High School (A)
 St. Francis Assisi High School (A)
 St. Joseph High School (A)
 St. Joseph's High School (A)
 St. Louis De Gonzague High School (A)
 St. Patrick Matriculation Higher Secondary School
 St. Peter's English High School
 St. Thomas High School
 The Study Middle School
 Subiksha English school
 Subramania Bharathi High School
 Sudha English High School
 Swami Vivekananda Vidyalaya, High School
 TAS English High School
 Valluvar High School (A)
 Vidhya Niketan High School
 Vruksha International School of Montessori

References

External links 

Official website of the Government of the Union Territory of Puducherry

Puducherry
Educational
Puducherry